Hawston is a village in the Western Cape, South Africa, It is a fishing village north-east of Mudge Point, 5 km north-west of Onrusrivier and 11 km from Hermanus. It is named after C.R. Haw, a civil commissioner of Caledon.

Located in the Overstrand Local Municipality, about an hour from Cape Town, it is located between Fisherhaven and Vermont, Western Cape, and is close to Hermanus.

References

Populated places in the Overstrand Local Municipality